Jacques Mersereau was a set decorator. He was nominated for an Academy Award in the category Best Art Direction for the film Thousands Cheer. He was also credited as a set decorator for  The White Cliffs of Dover.

Selected filmography
 Thousands Cheer (1943)
  The White Cliffs of Dover (1944)

References

External links

Year of birth missing
Year of death missing
Set decorators